The 2013–14 South Carolina Gamecocks women's basketball team will represent University of South Carolina during the 2013–14 NCAA Division I women's basketball season. The Gamecocks, led by sixth year head coach Dawn Staley, play their home games at the Colonial Life Arena and are members of the Southeastern Conference.

Roster

Schedule

|-
!colspan=9| Exhibition

|-
!colspan=9| Regular Season

|-
!colspan=9| SEC tournament

|-
!colspan=9| NCAA women's tournament

Source

Rankings

See also
2013–14 South Carolina Gamecocks men's basketball team

References

South Carolina Gamecocks women's basketball seasons
South Carolina
South Carolina